Pemphigoid nodularis is a cutaneous condition that is a variant of bullous pemphigoid that has skin lesions mimicking prurigo nodularis.

The antibody involved is IgG.

See also 
 Adult linear IgA disease
 List of cutaneous conditions

References 

Chronic blistering cutaneous conditions